Paul Viiding (22 May 1904 – 27 June 1962) was an Estonian poet, author and literary critic.

Born in Valga, to Juhan and Ann Viiding (née Rose), he was the oldest of two children; his sister Linda was born in 1907. He graduated with a degree in mathematics in Tartu before pursuing a career as an author and poet. He was a member of the influential group of Estonian poets brought together in 1938 by literary scholar Ants Oras who was greatly influenced by T. S. Eliot. The small circle of six poets became known as Arbujad ("Soothsayers") and included Heiti Talvik, Betti Alver, Uku Masing, Bernard Kangro, Kersti Merilaas, Mart Raud and August Sang.

Viiding married translator Linda Laarmann and had four children: Reet, Anni, Mari Tarand and the youngest (and only son) Juhan Viiding. His grandchildren include historian Juhan Kreem, musician Jaagup Kreem, poet Elo Viiding, politician Indrek Tarand, and journalist Kaarel Tarand.     

Paul Viiding died in Tallinn, Estonia in 1962.

References

Sources
Tarand, Mari. Katse mõista Paul Viidingu teekonda. In: Akadeemia 1997, No. 3, pp. 598–611

1904 births
1962 deaths
People from Valga, Estonia
People from the Governorate of Livonia
Estonian male poets
20th-century Estonian poets
20th-century male writers